Yubanare Island is one of the islands of Amami Islands of Satsunan Islands, Japan, which is 1 kilometer to the northwest of Sukomobanare Island. It administratively belongs to Setouchi, Ōshima District, Kagoshima Prefecture.

The island is generally oval-shaped except for a minor protrusion at its northeastern end and its area is 0.15 square kilometer.

See also

 Desert island
 List of islands

References

 
Islands of Kagoshima Prefecture
Satsunan Islands
Uninhabited islands of Japan